The International Academy of Astronautics (IAA) is an independent non-governmental organization established in Stockholm (Sweden) on August 16, 1960, by Dr. Theodore von Kármán, and recognized by the United Nations in 1996.

The IAA has elected members from all over the world.

Since 1960, the IAA has brought together the world's foremost experts in the disciplines of astronautics on a regular basis:

 to recognize the accomplishments of their peers,
 to explore and discuss cutting-edge issues in space research and technology, and
 to provide direction and guidance in the non-military uses of space and the ongoing exploration of the solar system.

The IAA is involved in numerous scientific activities. For example, the academy:

 Encourages international scientific cooperation through conferences, symposia and meetings in the area of: space sciences, space life sciences, space technology & system development, space systems operations & utilization, space policy, law & economy, space & society, culture & education;
 Conducts 30+ conferences per year;
 Publishes cosmic studies dealing with a wide variety of topics including space exploration, space debris, small satellites, space traffic management, natural disaster, climate change, etc.;
 Publishes the journal of the International Academy of Astronautics, Acta Astronautica.
 Publishes dictionaries in 24 languages (last languages Afrikaner and Swahili); and
 Publishes book series on small satellite, conference proceedings, remote sensing and history.

Recent developments, e.g., the easing of East–West tensions, the progressive integration of European economies, and the emergence of the Asian economic revolution, have enhanced the political prospects for international cooperation in space. Cost, scope, complexity and other pragmatic considerations associated with space exploration dictate cooperation among nations; and it is probable that such 21st century initiatives as a permanent lunar base and the first crewed mission to Mars will be international ventures.

IAA Mission 
The fundamental purposes of the IAA, as stated in the academy's statutes, are to:

 Foster the development of astronautics for peaceful purposes,
 Recognize individuals who have distinguished themselves in a branch of science or technology related to astronautics,
 Provide a program through which the membership can contribute to international endeavors,
 Promote international cooperation in the advancement of aerospace science.

Tradition of Excellence 
The International Academy of Astronautics is based on the tradition of the great classical scientific academies of the 17th century in Rome, London, and Paris, which fostered scientific inquiry and the exchange of ideas and new information in the earliest days of modern science.

In the words of IAA's second president, Dr. Frank J. Malina : “ the classical academies served in a remarkable manner the phenomenal advance of man’s new method of understanding nature and of applying this understanding for the benefit of mankind “.

The IAA coordinates closely with national academies to foster a spirit of cooperation and progress that transcends national boundaries, cultures, and institutions.

The IAA has established cooperation with: Royal Swedish Academy of Sciences (since 1985), Austrian Academy of Sciences (since 1986), French Academy of Sciences (since 1988), English Royal Society (since 1988), Academy of Finland (since 1988), Indian Academy of Sciences (since 1990), Royal Spanish Academy of Sciences (since 1989), German Academy of Sciences (since 1990), Kingdom of Netherlands (since 1990), Academies of Arts, Humanities & Sciences of Canada also known as  Royal Society of Canada (since 1991), U.S. National Academy of Sciences (since 1992), U.S. National Academy of Engineering (since 1992), Israel Academy of Sciences and Humanities (since 1994), Norwegian Academy of Science and Letters (since 1995), Chinese Academy of Sciences (since 1996), Royal Academy of Sciences of Turin (since 1997), Australian Academy of Science (since 1998), Australian Academy of Technological Science and Engineering (since 1998), Royal Netherlands Academy of Arts and Sciences (since 1999), Brazilian Academy of Sciences (since 2000), U.S. Institute of Medicine (since 2002), Academy of Sciences of Ukraine (since 2010), Academy of Sciences of South Africa (since 2011), Royal Society of South Africa (since 2011) and Pontifical Academy of Sciences (since 2012).

IAA presidents 
The academy's beginning was led by IAA's first president Theodore von Kármán. Edward C. Stone held the post until October 2009. G. Madhavan Nair, the chairman of Indian Space Research Organization was president of the International Academy of Astronautics from August 2009 until 2015. He was the only Indian and the first non-American to head the IAA.

IAA journal

The IAA sponsors the monthly journal Acta Astronautica, published by Elsevier Press, which "covers developments in space science technology in relation to peaceful scientific exploration of space and its exploitation for human welfare and progress, the conception, design, development and operation of space-borne and Earth-based systems".

References

External links

IAA Acta Astronautica Journal

Space advocacy organizations
Organizations based in Stockholm
International academies